Optima is a typeface.

Optima may also refer to:

Arts, media, and entertainment
 Optima (EP), a 1996 EP by Christ Analogue
 Optima, the newsletter of the Mathematical Optimization Society

Businesses and organizations
 Optima bank, a bank company in Greece
 Optima Bus Corporation, a former United States bus manufacturer
 Optima Telekom, a telecommunications operator in Croatia
 Optima, a convenience store operated by Sunoco at Wal-Mart stores
 Optima, a series of automotive batteries produced by Johnson Controls
 Optima Card, a revolving credit card issued by American Express from 1987 to 2009
 Optima Health, a managed-care plan by Sentara Healthcare
 Televisión Regional de Chile, a private terrestrial television channel in Chile, formerly known as Televisión Óptima from 2005 to 2006

Places
 Optima, Oklahoma, United States, a town
 Optima Lake
 Optima National Wildlife Refuge
 Optima Signature, a residential skyscraper in Chicago, Illinois, United States

Vehicles
 Optima, a barque that wrecked in 1905
 Eagle Optima, a 1990 American mid-size concept sedan
 Kia Optima, a 2000–present Korean mid-size car
 Daewoo LeMans, a 1986–2016 Korean compact car, sold in Canada from 1988 to 1991 as Passport Optima

Other uses
 Optima (grape), a German white wine grape

See also
 Optimal